Gnathothlibus samoaensis is a moth of the  family Sphingidae. It is known from Samoa.

The length of the forewings is 35.4–44.3 mm for males and 43.6–44.7 for females. It is similar to Gnathothlibus fijiensis but the outer edge of the tegula is creamy white.

Etymology
The specific name samoaensis is derived from the Pacific Island nation of Samoa, formally Western Samoa, the only recorded locality for the species.

References

Gnathothlibus
Moths described in 2009